Wellington Jighere (born  in Umolo-Olomu, Delta State, Nigeria), is a professional Nigerian scrabble player who won the inaugural WESPA Championship in 2015 to become the first African player to be crowned World Scrabble Champion. He defeated Lewis MacKay in four straight wins.

Achievements
World Scrabble Championships
2007 – 3rd place
2009 – 11th place
2015 – winner
2017 – 4th place
Two times African Scrabble Championship winner (2008 & 2010)

References

External links

World Scrabble Championship winners
Living people
1983 births
People from Edo State
University of Benin (Nigeria) alumni
Nigerian Scrabble players